Fortune magazine's 40 Under 40 is a list of individuals the publication considers to be the most influential young leaders for the year. The list has existed in two phases: First, from 1999 to 2003, the list was presented purely as a numeric ranking of wealth, capturing the first dot com boom. The current iteration started in 2009 and is a subjective ranking of power and influence.  The list includes business executives, political figures, sportsmen, fashion designers, and others who are under the age of forty years old. The majority of the list members are business executives from the tech industry.

The list often features business men and women who have made their names in various enterprises, and does not always choose candidates from blue chip industries.

See also
 Other Fortune lists

References

External links
 Current list

Fortune (magazine)
Lists of people by magazine appearance